Yellowstone (British TV series), 2009 BBC documentary series about Yellowstone National Park
Yellowstone (American TV series), a 2018 television drama